This list of Lincoln University alumni includes graduates, non-graduate former students and current students of Lincoln University, a historically black university (HBCU). 

Lincoln University has many notable alumni, including Rev. Dr. Thurgood Marshall, Langston Hughes, Hildrus Poindexter, Horace Mann Bond, Roscoe Lee Browne, Robert L. Carter, Nnamdi Azikiwe, Kwame Nkrumah, Melvin B. Tolson, and Conrad Tillard. Many of Hughes' papers reside in the Langston Hughes Memorial Library on campus. Nnamdi Azikiwe and Kwame Nkrumah were the first President/Prime Minister of Nigeria and Ghana respectively, fulfilling John Miller Dickey's vision of Lincoln University as a training institution for African leadership. At least ten of its alumni have served as United States ambassadors or mission chiefs. Many are federal, state, and municipal judges, and many others have served as mayors or city managers. 

South Carolina State University, Livingstone College, Albany State University, Texas Southern University, Ibeme Memorial College (Nigeria), Ibibio State College (Nigeria), and Kwame Nkrumah University of Science and Technology (Ghana) were all founded by Lincoln alumni.

References

Lincoln University alumni